John G. Drosdick is an American businessman who served 8 years as president, Chief Executive Officer and Chairman of the Board of Directors of Sunoco Inc.  As of 2006, he was the fifteenth-highest-paid chief executive officer in the United States. In 2008, he was replaced by Lynn Laverty Elsenhans.

Career 
He is also chairman of the Board of Trustees of Villanova University and serves on the boards of directors of H. J. Heinz Company and U.S. Steel.

Philanthropy 
Drosdick provided a $2.5 million commitment to  Villanova University, as part of the University's $600 million Comprehensive Capital Campaign.

Personal life 
Drosdick received a Bachelor of Science degree in chemical engineering from Villanova and a Master of Science degree in chemical engineering from the University of Massachusetts Amherst.

References

Year of birth missing (living people)
Living people
Villanova University alumni
American chief executives of Fortune 500 companies
Sunoco LP people
American chairpersons of corporations
American corporate directors
University of Massachusetts Amherst College of Engineering alumni